The IBM 4683 was IBM's first PC-based point of sale (POS) system. It was introduced in 1985. The system consists of a PC-based controller and thin client based POS workstations, typically with a Token Ring network. The system requires an IBM AS/400 server to be in the network. The 4683 is still used today by some retailers (such as TOYS "R" US in the UK). However the 4683 has been phased out by some retailers to its more modern successors, the IBM 4693 and the IBM 4694.

See also
Digital Research
FlexOS
IBM 4680 OS
IBM 4690 OS
IBM 4693
IBM 4694
IBM 4695

4683